Elway to Marino is a 2013 ESPN 30 for 30 documentary about the first round of the 1983 NFL draft. The film was released on April 23, 2013, directed by Ken Rodgers, and produced by NFL Films.

The film explores the 1983 NFL Draft through the eyes of Marvin Demoff, the then agent for Dan Marino and John Elway via the notes that he wrote in real time starting in the months leading up to the draft. The film covers the battle between Demoff, Elway and the Elway family and the Baltimore Colts who had the 1st overall pick that year until the ultimate trading of him to the Denver Broncos, the fall of Dan Marino through the draft and the other teams and their various picks and what happened to them.

The film features Demoff, Elway, Marino, Jim Kelly, Chris Berman and then Colts general manager Ernie Accorsi, as well as interviews with other NFL personnel involved in the draft, as well as some of the other first round draft picks of 1983.

The film's main focus was on John Elway's desire to not play for the Colts, citing their dysfunctional status and the sheer dislike of despised then-owner Robert Irsay, and the attempts by the Colts to trade their #1 draft pick to other teams. Among the trades that were explored was a draft-day trade with the New England Patriots involving John Hannah, a three-way trade with the Los Angeles Raiders and the Chicago Bears, and a trade with the San Francisco 49ers for Joe Montana. The Colts nearly made a trade with the Dallas Cowboys, but the deal was lost when Irsay intervened. In the end the Colts trade Elway to the Denver Broncos in a deal that was done by Irsay without Accorsi's consent; part of the terms of that deal involved Irsay getting paid a large amount of money for upcoming preseason games vs. Denver, which was a major factor in Accorsi resigning his position.

The film's main subplot chronicles Dan Marino's initially miserable draft day, as unfounded rumors about him using drugs while playing for Pitt (at one point, Marino's Pitt teammate, good friend, and 1983 1st-round pick with the Chicago Bears Jimbo Covert relates with disgust how several teams told him they "knew" Marino was a drug user and asked him to provide more details to them) led to him falling down in the 1st-round as objectively less-talented QBs like Todd Blackledge and Ken O'Brien were taken ahead of him. But the story changes for Marino when an already-excellent team, the Miami Dolphins made it clear they were going to take him with the 27th pick in the 1st round and did so. The film shows the varied reactions from ESPN's commentators (Paul Zimmerman castigates Miami for taking Marino but steps on his argument when he cites the Dolphins' defensive coordinator in relation to the coaching he's sure Marino needs, while Chris Berman both then and now politely but clearly dismisses Dr. Z's historically-failed views by saying that "Dan Marino's going to play for the Dolphins. For Don Shula. It's OK."). It's also noted that the other team that went to (and won) the previous year's Super Bowl, Washington, finished the 1983 1st-round by also taking a player who would someday be in the Hall of Fame: cornerback Darrell Green.

Background
The 1983 draft is frequently referred to as the draft with the quarterback class of 1983, because six quarterbacks were taken in the first round, an unusually high number.

Of these quarterbacks, four played in the Super Bowl, four  were selected to play in the Pro Bowl, and three have been inducted into the Pro Football Hall of Fame. The next highest number of quarterbacks taken in the first round is the five taken in the 1999 and 2018 NFL Draft.  All six quarterbacks were drafted by American Football Conference (AFC) teams, with every member of the five-team AFC East (the Colts, Dolphins, Bills, Jets and Patriots) selecting a quarterback.  In eleven of the sixteen years following this draft, the AFC was represented in the Super Bowl by a team led by one of these quarterbacks:  the Denver Broncos by John Elway (five times), the Buffalo Bills by Jim Kelly (four times), the Miami Dolphins by Dan Marino (once), or the New England Patriots by Tony Eason (once).

Of the six first round quarterbacks drafted, two did not sign with the teams that selected them for the 1983 season. First overall pick Elway, who had made his antipathy towards the Colts known long before the draft, was also a promising baseball player in the New York Yankees organization. With Yankees owner George Steinbrenner aggressively pursuing a commitment from Elway to play baseball full-time. The other was Jim Kelly, who was selected 14th overall by the Buffalo Bills but would turn them down initially to play with the Houston Gamblers in the USFL, before joining the Bills in 1986 and playing his entire Hall of Fame career with the team.

References

External links

"30 for 30" - Elway to Marino on ESPN

NFL Films
Documentary films about American football
2013 television films
2013 films
30 for 30
Films set in the 1980s
Films set in 1983
1983 in American football
Denver Broncos
Miami Dolphins
Baltimore Colts
Buffalo Bills
2010s American films